High Buston is a small hamlet and former civil parish, now in the parish of Alnmouth, on Northumberland coast situated between Alnmouth and Warkworth. High Buston Hall is a Grade II listed Georgian manor house, built about 1784. In 1951 the parish had a population of 55.

Governance 
High Buston is in the parliamentary constituency of Berwick-upon-Tweed. In 1866 High Buston became a civil parish in its own right until it was abolished on 1 April 1955 and merged with Alnmouth.

References

External links

Hamlets in Northumberland
Former civil parishes in Northumberland